Freibergite is a complex sulfosalt mineral of silver, copper, iron, antimony and arsenic with formula . It has cubic crystals and is formed in hydrothermal deposits. It forms one solid solution series with tetrahedrite and another with argentotennantite. Freibergite is an opaque, metallic steel grey to black and leaves a reddish-black streak. It has a Mohs hardness of 3.5 to 4.0 and a specific gravity of 4.85 - 5. It is typically massive to granular in habit with no cleavage and an irregular fracture.

The mineral was first described in 1853 from an occurrence in the silver mines of the type locality at Freiberg, Saxony.

References

Mineral handbook
Webmineral
Mindat

Silver minerals
Iron minerals
Copper minerals
Arsenic minerals
Antimony minerals
Sulfosalt minerals
Freiberg
Cubic minerals
Minerals in space group 217
Minerals described in 1853